In information technology and computer science, the pattern of applying one-way mutations on an immutable data state is called unidirectional data flow. Separation of state changes from presentation has many benefits and was popularized with Redux for unidirectional data flow combined with React for presenting, or rendering, data state.

See also
 Data (computing)

References

External links
 Redux concepts
 MobX principles

Cognition
Models of computation